Adventures of Cow is a 2005 children's picture book series written by Lori Korchek and illustrated by Marshall Taylor. The sequel, Adventures of Cow, Too, was published in 2007.

Series
Adventures of Cow
A squish toy cow travels in a yellow backpack. She asks various misidentified farm animals how to get home, because she is very confused and not really smart. Back home, she talks to her family which are a penguin doorstep, a hippo vase, and a vegetable brush. Her aunt, a vegetable brush, suggests that she write books about her adventures. That causes the toy cow to become famous and appear on TV.
Adventures of Cow Too
Cow needs groceries and she has just a few items on the list. Also, Cow needs to make it home on time. It has vocabulary mix-ups and silly on-location photographs.

Reception
Adventures of Cow was selected as a Sonder Books Stand Out (2005) and received positive reviews from Eclectica Magazine, The Book Stacks, Kirkus Reviews, and Armchair Interviews.

The School Library Journal reviewed in poorly, stating, "For children in the concrete stages of development, this book will be confusing, not funny. Other youngsters will just be bored."

References

External links
Adventures of Cow official website

American children's books
American picture books
2005 children's books
Fictional cattle
Animal tales
2007 children's books